The Fifth Army Corps was a formation of the United States Army raised for the Spanish–American War, and noted chiefly for its victory in the Siege of Santiago, which led to the general collapse of the Spanish war effort.

Assembly and Formation
As relations between Spain and the United States deteriorated in the spring of 1898, the leaders of the U.S. Army began to plan for its first large-scale campaign since the Civil War, which had ended more than 30 years previously. On April 15, 1898, the regiments of the Regular Army were ordered to various assembly points in the South, with only a handful of units to remain at their peacetime posts. Seven regiments of infantry were ordered to Tampa, Florida and Brigadier General James F. Wade assigned to command the assembled troops. Two weeks later, Brigadier General William Rufus Shafter, at the time commanding the troops assembling at New Orleans, was directed to Tampa and assume command.

Five more regiments were ordered to Tampa on May 10 from Camp Thomas, Georgia (in the Chickamauga Battlefield Park), where the troops assembled had been formed into a provisional corps, the first command larger than brigade-size the Army had organized since the Civil War.

Meanwhile, following the declaration of war, General Order 36 of May 7 had approved the organization of eight "army corps," each of which was to consist of three or more divisions of three brigades each. Each brigade was to have approximately 3,600 officers and enlisted men organized into three regiments and, with three such brigades, each division was to total about 11,000 officers and men. Thus the division was to be about the same size as the division of 1861, but army corps were to be larger. The division staff initially was to have an adjutant general, quartermaster, commissary, surgeon, inspector general and engineer, with an ordnance officer added later. The brigade staff was identical except that no inspector general or ordnance officer was authorized.

General Order 46 of May 16, 1898 assigned commanding officers and training camps to the new corps. Major General William R. Shafter was named as commander of Fifth Army Corps, which assumed control of the troops assembling at Tampa, Florida.

Embarkation and Landing
On June 7, the corps began embarking on transports for the landing in Cuba, although this took a week (due to a combination of poor organization by senior officers and fears of an attack by the Spanish fleet, which was capable of no such activity) and the fleet did not sail until June 14. Reaching Cuban waters without incident, the troops began landing at Daiquiri on June 22.

Evacuation and Quarantine
As the troops continued to suffer from disease, including yellow fever misdiagnosed as malaria, it was decided to return the men of Fifth Army Corps to the United States and a site on Montauk Point, Long Island was chosen, being convenient to the Long Island Rail Road and in theory, an easy location to quarantine; Camp Wickoff was established there and the corps completed its movement into quarantine camp on August 24, 1898. As men recovered, units were mustered out of service; by September 30, the corps strength was 218 officers and 5,136 enlisted men.

Fifth Army Corps was "discontinued" on October 3, 1898.

References

Military units and formations of the United States in the Spanish–American War
Military units and formations established in 1898